This is a list of civil parishes and unparished areas in the ceremonial county of Lincolnshire, England. There are about 623 civil parishes.

Table of civil parishes

Sources
 Formerly Alford Urban District
 Formerly Barton upon Humber Urban District
 Formerly Boston Municipal Borough
 Formerly Boston Rural District
 Formerly Bourne Urban District
 Formerly Brigg Urban District
 Formerly Caistor Rural District
 Formerly Cleethorpes Municipal Borough
 Formerly East Elloe Rural District
 Formerly East Kesteven Rural District
 Formerly Gainsborough Rural District
 Formerly Gainsborough Urban District
 Formerly Glanford Brigg Rural District
 Formerly Goole Rural District
 Formerly Grantham Municipal Borough
 Formerly Grimsby County Borough
 Formerly Grimsby Rural District
 Formerly Horncastle Rural District
 Formerly Horncastle Urban District
 Formerly Isle of Axholme Rural District
 Formerly Lincoln County Borough
 Formerly Louth Municipal Borough
 Formerly Louth Rural District
 Formerly Mablethorpe and Sutton Urban District
 Formerly Market Rasen Urban District
 Formerly Newark Rural District
 Formerly North Kesteven Rural District
 Formerly Scunthorpe Municipal Borough
 Formerly Skegness Urban District
 Formerly Sleaford Urban District
 Formerly South Kesteven Rural District
 Formerly Spalding Rural District
 Formerly Spalding Urban District
 Formerly Spilsby Rural District
 Formerly Stamford Municipal Borough
 Formerly Welton Rural District
 Formerly West Kesteven Rural District
 Formerly Woodhall Spa Urban District

See also
 List of civil parishes in England

References

External links
 Office for National Statistics : Geographical Area Listings

Civil parishes
Lincolnshire